67 electorate members of the New Zealand House of Representatives were to be elected in the general election on 27 November 1999. The tables below show the candidates for each electorate. Incumbent electorate MPs are highlighted in blue, and those candidates who were members of the previous parliament via their party list—regardless of which electorate they previously contested—are highlighted in red.

Where candidates were listed on their party's list, this is shown accordingly. There are a number of cases why candidates don't have a list ranking:
Some candidates belong to a registered party, but they were not on their party's list – this is shown on "none".
Some candidates belong to a registered party, but the party did not submit a party list – the list field is blank in this case.
Some candidates belong to an unregistered party, and those cannot submit a party list – the list field is blank in this case.

At the 1999 general election, three registered parties did not submit a list:
Asia Pacific United Party
Mana Wahine Te Ira Tangata
Te Tawharau

General electorates

Albany

|}

Aoraki

|}

Auckland Central

|}

Banks Peninsula

|}

Bay of Plenty

|}

Christchurch Central

|}

Christchurch East

|-
!colspan=6|Retiring incumbents and withdrawn candidates
|-

|}

Clutha-Southland

|}

Coromandel

|}

Dunedin North

|}

Dunedin South

|}

East Coast

|}

Epsom

|-
!colspan=6|Retiring incumbents and withdrawn candidates
|-

|}

Hamilton East

 

|}

Hamilton West

|}

Hunua

|}

Hutt South

|}

Ilam

|}

Invercargill

|}

Kaikoura

|-
!colspan=6|Retiring incumbents and withdrawn candidates
|-

|}

Karapiro

|}

Mana

|}

Māngere

|}

Manukau East

|}

Manurewa

|}

Maungakiekie

|}

Mount Albert

|}

Mount Roskill

|}

Napier

|}

Nelson

|}

New Plymouth

|-
!colspan=6|Retiring incumbents and withdrawn candidates
|-

|}

North Shore

|}

Northcote

|}

Northland

|}

Ohariu-Belmont

|}

Otago

|-
!colspan=6|Retiring incumbents and withdrawn candidates
|-

|}

Otaki 

|}

Pakuranga 

|}

Palmerston North 

|-
!colspan=6|Retiring incumbents and withdrawn candidates
|-

|}

Port Waikato 

|-
!colspan=6|Retiring incumbents and withdrawn candidates
|-

|}

Rakaia 

|}

Rangitikei 

|-
!colspan=6|Retiring incumbents and withdrawn candidates
|-

|}

Rimutaka 

|}

Rodney 

|}

Rongotai 

|}

Rotorua

|}

Tamaki 

|}

Taranaki-King Country

|}

Taupo

|}

Tauranga 

|-
!colspan=6|Retiring incumbents and withdrawn candidates
|-

|}

Te Atatu 

|}

Titirangi

|}

Tukituki 

|}

Waimakariri 

|-
!colspan=6|Retiring incumbents and withdrawn candidates
|-

|}

Wairarapa

|}

Waitakere 

|}

Wellington Central 

|-
!colspan=6|Retiring incumbents and withdrawn candidates
|-

|}

West Coast-Tasman 

|}

Whanganui 

|}

Whangarei 

|-
!colspan=6|Retiring incumbents and withdrawn candidates
|-

|}

Wigram 

|}

Māori electorates

Hauraki Maori

|}

Ikaroa-Rāwhiti 

|}

Te Tai Hauāuru

|}

Te Tai Tokerau

|}

Te Tai Tonga 

|}

Waiariki

|-
!colspan=6|Retiring incumbents and withdrawn candidates
|-

|}

References

1999 New Zealand general election
Candidates 1999